William Pilch (18 June 1820 – 11 January 1882) was an English cricketer who played first-class cricket for Kent County Cricket Club, the Players, teams calling themselves "England" and other teams in a professional cricket career that extended from 1840 to 1857. He was a member of a famous cricketing family: his father was Nathaniel Pilch, and the great Fuller Pilch and an older William Pilch were his uncles. He was born at Brinton, Norfolk and died at Canterbury, Kent.

References

1820 births
1882 deaths
All-England Eleven cricketers
English cricketers
Kent cricketers
Married v Single cricketers
Non-international England cricketers
Players cricketers
People from Brinton, Norfolk